The Mystery of the Villa Rose (French: Le mystère de la villa rose) is a 1930 French mystery film directed by René Hervil and Louis Mercanton and starring Léon Mathot, Simone Vaudry, and Louis Baron fils.

Production
The film is based on the 1910 novel At the Villa Rose by A.E.W. Mason. A separate English-language version At the Villa Rose was made by Twickenham Studios. The film's sets were designed by James A. Carter. Different sources disagree over where the French-language version was actually made, with one claim that it was produced at Twickenham as the first bilingual film in Britain. Alternatively it is suggested that it was made at the newly established Courbevoie Studios in Paris, in which case it could lay a claim to be one of the earliest French sound films. Britain had converted to sound faster than France so several French filmmakers went to British studios to make films for release in France. Another French-language version of a Mason novel La Maison de la Fléche, was also shot at Twickenham during the period.

Cast
 Léon Mathot as Langeac  
 Simone Vaudry as Mado Dubreuil  
 Louis Baron fils as Le Maillan  
 Héléna Manson as Hélène Vauquier  
 Georges Péclet as Mortagne  
 Alice Ael as Madame Dauvray  
 Jacques Henley as Le juge d'instruction  
 Dahlia as L'inconnue  
 Jean Mercanton as Le petit garçon  
 René Montis as Le chauffeur

References

Bibliography 
 Crisp, C.G. The Classic French Cinema, 1930-1960. Indiana University Press, 1993.

External links 
 

1930 films
1930 mystery films
French mystery films
1930s French-language films
Films directed by Louis Mercanton
Films directed by René Hervil
Films based on British novels
French multilingual films
French black-and-white films
1930 multilingual films
1930s French films